David Glenn Lunceford (May 6, 1934 – May 23, 2009) was an offensive lineman who played for Baylor University and for the Chicago Cardinals of the National Football League.

Lunceford grew up in Tyler Texas, graduating from Van High School in 1952 and lettering in three sports.  After a year at Tyler Junior College, he was recruited by Baylor, where he lettered in all three seasons (1954–1956), playing both offensive and defensive tackle.  He appeared in both of Baylor's bowl games during that period: the December 31, 1954 Gator Bowl, (which Baylor lost to Auburn 33-17), and the 1957 New Year's Day Sugar Bowl, in which Baylor upset the undefeated Tennessee Volunteers and their superstar (and future Hall of Fame coach) Johnny Majors 13-7.

Lunceford was drafted by the Cardinals in 1957.  He played offensive guard for all 12 games in 1957.  Injuries ended his career before the start of the 1958 season.

After the NFL, Lunceford returned to his native Tyler and went to work in the oil industry, starting with Humble Oil and Refining, which later merged with Standard Oil of New Jersey (which ultimately became Exxon).  He retired from Exxon in 1992, and he continued to work as a management consultant thereafter, as well as serving in various capacities in Tyler for his church, the community, and the local junior college.

Mr. Lunceford died on May 23, 2009 from complications of Alzheimer's disease.

External links
Obituary from the Tyler Morning Telegraph

1934 births
2009 deaths
American football offensive linemen
Baylor Bears football players
Chicago Cardinals players
Deaths from Alzheimer's disease
ExxonMobil people
Sportspeople from Tyler, Texas
People from Canton, Texas
Tyler Apaches football players
Players of American football from Texas
Neurological disease deaths in Texas